Uljin Airfield (IATA: UJN, ICAO: RKTL) (Korean: 울진비행장) is a partially finished airport near Uljin County, South Korea. Construction was suspended in 2005 after the airport was 85% complete. The Board of Audit and Inspection halted construction after it was determined no airline wanted to use the airport. The airport gained international notoriety when it was selected by Agence France-Presse as one of its "Zany stories of 2007". The AFP reported "A town in South Korea which spent some US$140 million to build its own airport was then forced to admit that no airlines actually wanted to fly there." Uljin Airport may be used for a pilot training center.

The runways are equipped with ILS.

References

Airports in South Korea
Proposed airports
Proposed transport infrastructure in South Korea